Cuitláhuac is a station on the Mexico City Metro. It is located in the Colonia Popotla and Colonia San Álvaro districts in the Miguel Hidalgo  borough of Mexico City, to the northwest of the city center. It lies along Line 2. In 2019, the station had an average ridership of 18,615 passengers per day.

Name and pictogram
The station's name comes from nearby Avenida Cuitláhuac, an avenue named in honor of Cultlahuanctzin (whose name was later changed into Spanish language as "Cuitláhuac"). He was the tenth, and penultimate, Aztec  emperor and the one who defeated Hernán Cortés in the Battle of La Noche Triste ("Sad Night") in 1520. The station pictogram depicts an Aztec battle shield.

General information
The station was opened on 14 September 1970 as part of the second stretch of Line 2, from Pino Suárez to Tacuba.

Metro Cuitláhuac is also close to Avenida México-Tacuba, one of the most important avenues in the city built on the former route of one of Tenochtitláns three main avenues into the mainland. The station also connects with trolleybus Line "I", which runs between Metro El Rosario and Metro Chapultepec.

The station serves the Popotla and San Álvaro neighborhoods.

Ridership

Exits
South: Calzada México-Tacuba and Avenida Cuitláhuac, Popotla
North: Calzada México-Tacuba and Avenida Cuitláhuac, Colonia San Álvaro

References

External links 

Mexico City Metro Line 2 stations
Railway stations opened in 1970
1970 establishments in Mexico
Mexico City Metro stations in Miguel Hidalgo, Mexico City